(born September 2, 1937 )  is a Japanese former professional baseball player. He played for the Hiroshima Carp from 1956 to 1967. From 1968 to 1970 he played for Kintetsu Buffaloes. He later served as a manager for Hiroshima.He played in the Japan Central League and the Japan Pacific League.

References

1937 births
Living people
Baseball people from Ōita Prefecture
Japanese baseball players
Hiroshima Carp players
Hiroshima Toyo Carp players
Kintetsu Buffaloes players
Managers of baseball teams in Japan
Hiroshima Toyo Carp managers